James Cerretani and Adil Shamasdin won the title. They defeated Jamie Delgado and Jonathan Marray 6–3, 5–7, [10–5] in the final.

Seeds
Cerretani and Shamasdin received a bye into the second round.

Draw

Draw

References
 Doubles Draw

Open EuroEnergie de Quimper - Doubles
2011 Doubles